Etlingera pavieana is a monocotyledonous plant species first described by Jean Baptiste Louis Pierre and François Gagnepain, and given its current name by Rosemary Margaret Smith. Etlingera pavieana is part of the genus Etlingera and the family Zingiberaceae. No subspecies are listed in the Catalog of Life.

References 

pavieana
Taxa named by Rosemary Margaret Smith